The Kokosing Gap Trail is a 14-mile-long recreational trail built on a former Pennsylvania Railroad right-of-way alongside the Kokosing River in east central Ohio. The trail begins in Mount Vernon and winds itself to Danville via Gambier and Howard.

History
The trail begins in Mt. Vernon's Phillips Park, where a large gravel parking area has been constructed. From there the trail follows Knox County’s scenic Kokosing River and surrounding countryside. Forested hills, wetlands, family farms, and the river itself offer pleasant scenery, and many opportunities for photography. The trail runs east to historic Gambier, the home of Kenyon College. Here, one can stop for a rest at one of the trail's restroom facilities and take photos of a cosmetically restored 1940s-era ALCO 0-6-0 steam locomotive, tender, flatcar and caboose. From Gambier, the trail continues northeast toward Howard, underneath Route 36 through a stone-arched tunnel, and then continues on towards Danville. Convenient mile markers along the way make it easy to note distances and to mark progress in physical fitness programs.

This trail at present is the longest paved rail-trail in the US maintained solely by volunteers and donations. It is also one of the first 500 rail trails in the U.S.

Wildlife along the trail includes white-tailed deer, gray squirrel, chipmunk, groundhog, mink, wild turkey, great blue heron, bald eagle, and several species of hawk and owl. Spring and summer wild flowers include trillium, mayapple, and jack-in-the-pulpit.

Location
Western terminus: Phillips Park in Mount Vernon at 
Eastern terminus: West of Danville at

References

Protected areas of Knox County, Ohio
Bike paths in Ohio
Rail trails in Ohio
Transportation in Knox County, Ohio
1991 establishments in Ohio